Ashford Bowdler railway station was a station in Ashford Bowdler, Shropshire, England. The station was opened in 1854 and closed in 1855

References

Disused railway stations in Shropshire
Railway stations in Great Britain opened in 1854
Railway stations in Great Britain closed in 1855
Former Shrewsbury and Hereford Railway stations